Minerve may refer to:

Minerva, a Roman goddess
Minerve, Hérault, a village in France
 French frigate Minerve (1782)
 French frigate Minerve (1794)
 French frigate Président (1804) or Minerve
 French frigate Minerve (1805)
 French frigate Minerve (1809)
 French submarine Minerve (1934)
 French submarine Minerve (S647)
 Minerve (airline), a former French airline
 La Minerve, a giant ascension balloon envisioned by Étienne-Gaspard Robert in 1820

See also
 Minerva (disambiguation)
 French ship Minerve